Syllonoma is a genus of moths belonging to the family Tortricidae, first described by Jerry A. Powell in 1985.

Species
Syllonoma longipalpana Powell, 1985

See also
List of Tortricidae genera

References

 , 1985: Discovery of two new species and genera of shaggy Tortricids related to Synnoma and Niasoma (Tortricidiae: Sparganothini). Journal of Research on the Lepidoptera 24 (1): 61–71. Full article: .

External links
tortricidae.com

Sparganothini
Tortricidae genera